Lothian and Borders is an area in Scotland consisting of the East Lothian, City of Edinburgh, Midlothian, West Lothian areas (collectively known as Lothian) along with the Scottish Borders.

The area constitutes a sheriffdom, and was also served by the Lothian and Borders Police and the Lothian and Borders Fire and Rescue Service until these were merged into new Scotland-wide services.

Administrative divisions of Scotland
Lothian
Geography of the Scottish Borders